Damaris is the name of a woman mentioned in a single verse in  Acts of the Apostles as one of those present when Paul of Tarsus preached in Athens in front of the Athenian Areopagus in c. AD 55.

Biblical narrative 
Together with Dionysius the Areopagite Damaris embraced the Christian faith following Paul's Areopagus sermon. The verse reads:
"Howbeit certain men clave unto him, and believed: among the which was Dionysius the Areopagite, and a woman named Damaris, and others with them." (KJV)

As usually women were not present in Areopagus meetings, Damaris has traditionally been assumed to have been a hetaera (courtesan, high-status prostitute); modern commentators have alternatively suggested she might also have been a follower of the Stoics (who welcomed women among their ranks) or a foreigner visiting Athens. 
The Georgian text of Acts makes Damaris the wife of Dionysius.

Veneration 
She is a saint of the Greek Orthodox Church, remembered on 3 October together with Dionysius the Areopagite and two other disciples of Dionysius, who also became martyrs. 3 October in the Julian calendar, which is used by the Old Calendarists, currently coincides with 16 October in the Gregorian calendar.

Etymology 
The etymology of the name is uncertain. Proposals include derivation from damar δάμαρ "wife, spouse", a contraction of
the classical Greek name Damarete Δαμαρέτη (attested as the name of a daughter of Theron of Acragas and wife of Gelo), or derivation from  damalis δάμαλις "heifer"; a Coptic derivation has also been considered.

References 

1st-century Romans
1st-century Greek people
1st-century Christian female saints
People in Acts of the Apostles
Saints of Roman Athens
Roman-era Athenian women
Women in the New Testament
1st-century Greek women